The 2007 Brisbane Broncos season was the twentieth in the club's history and they competed in the NRL's 2007 Telstra Premiership. Coached by Wayne Bennett and captained by Darren Lockyer, the Broncos made the finals by just scraping into the top 8, but were knocked out in the first week by eventual premiers, Melbourne Storm. Two and a half years later the Storm would be found to have been cheating the salary cap over the previous four seasons and their 2007 premiership was stripped.

Pre-season
The Broncos' pre-season involved two matches in England and two more trial matches upon their return to Australia.

World Club Challenge

As reigning NRL premiers, on 23 February 2007 The Brisbane Broncos played against English Super League champions St Helens R.F.C. in the 2007 World Club Challenge.  St Helens took the match 18–14 in the last minutes.

Telstra Premiership

The World Club Challenge loss was followed by a poor start to the 2007 NRL season by the Broncos, who lost their captain and five-eighth Darren Lockyer to an ankle injury after the first match against the North Queensland Cowboys. Lockyer returned to the field in Round 3 against the Penrith Panthers, but Brisbane had lost their first three games in a row for the first time since 1999. They racked up their first win against the Sydney Roosters in the traditional Good Friday match played by the two clubs. Another loss followed by a win in the Andrew Johns farewell against Newcastle in Round 6.

When, in the Round 7 replay of last year's grand-final, Brisbane were unable to defeat Melbourne, they had managed to win just 2 of their first seven games, compared to their strong starts in 2006 and 2005. Having not yet played an NRL game in 2007, Tame Tupou, the Broncos' top try-scorer for the previous season, left the club in round 7 for England. In round 11 Brisbane were at the bottom of the ladder before racking up their biggest ever win, defeating an under-strength Newcastle Knights 71–6. It was also the Knights' biggest ever loss and the most points the Broncos had ever scored in a game. This was followed up with a loss to an understrength St George Illawarra Dragons.

As a result of the team's form, coach Wayne Bennett gave the players time off during the Broncos' bye. This strategy appeared to be successful, with the team winning five successive games. However, in their Round 18 win against the Cowboys, Lockyer tore his anterior cruciate ligament, ruling him out for the rest of the season. Lockyer's injury, combined with injuries to big-name players Karmichael Hunt, Justin Hodges, Brent Tate and Shaun Berrigan, played a role in Brisbane winning just two of their last eight games of the season.

In the last round of the 2007 regular season, the Broncos suffered an embarrassing 68–22 loss to Parramatta, equalling their worst ever defeat and most points conceded in a match. However, the club still finished eighth after the regular season, thus making the finals for the sixteenth straight year. Brisbane's efforts did not improve the following Sunday when they played their 500th game ever and their last of the season, being defeated soundly by eventual premiers the Melbourne Storm 40–0. Only one year after winning the premiership, 2007 saw the second time ever that the Broncos lost more games than they won in a season of football.

At the end of the season the Brisbane Broncos hed a gala ball at which coach Wayne Bennett was made a life member of the club. His refusal to make an acceptance speech at the club's presentation ball showed the strain in his relationship with the Broncos.
On 9 October 2007, the club announced the termination of the contracts of squad members Ian Lacey and John Te Reo, after they were involved in the assault of a man after the ball.

Ladder

Scorers (After Round 25)
For NRL first-grade matches only.

2007 match results

Honours

League
Nil

Club
Player of the year: Petero Civoniceva
Rookie of the year: David Taylor
Back of the year: Karmichael Hunt
Forward of the year: Brad Thorn
Club man of the year: Petero Civoniceva/Brad Thorn

Players
Bold Players have played International or State any year

Full Backs
Australian  Karmichael Hunt
Australian Denan Kemp
Wingers
New Zealander Tame Tupou (released by the club after Round 7 without playing this season)
Australian Darius Boyd
Australian Stephen Michaels
Australian Craig Frawley
Centres
Australian Shaun Berrigan
Australian Justin Hodges
Australian Brent Tate
Australian Nick Emmett 
Halves
Australian Darren Lockyer (c)
Australian Shane Perry
Australian Brent McConnell
Australian Joel Moon
Hookers
Australian Michael Ennis
Australian Ian Lacey
New Zealander John Te Reo
Australian Michael Roberts
Props
Australian Petero Civoniceva (vc)
Australian Ben Hannant
Australian Nick Kenny
Australian Corey Parker
Australian Sam Thaiday
Australian Dave Taylor
Second Rowers
Australian Dane Carlaw
Australian David Stagg
Australian Brad Thorn
Australian Clifford Manua
Locks
Australian  Tonie Carroll
New Zealander Greg Eastwood

Player movements

Gains

Losses

Re-signings

Off Contract at end of 2007

References

Brisbane Broncos seasons
Brisbane Broncos season